George Wollaston (1738–1826) was an English Anglican priest.  He was elected a Fellow of the Royal Society in 1763.

He was the son of Francis Wollaston (1694-1774). He was educated at Charterhouse School and Sidney Sussex College, Cambridge, where he graduated second wrangler in 1758. He married in 1765 Elizabeth Palmer of Thurnscoe Hall and they had a single daughter Elizabeth Palmer Wollaston who died in infancy (17 April 1766).

References

1738 births
1826 deaths
People educated at Charterhouse School
Fellows of the Royal Society
Alumni of Sidney Sussex College, Cambridge
Second Wranglers